Rab proteins geranylgeranyltransferase component A 2 is an enzyme that in humans is encoded by the CHML gene.

The product of the CHML gene supports geranylgeranylation of most Rab proteins and may substitute for REP-1 in tissues other than retina. CHML is localized close to the gene for Usher syndrome type II.

Interactions 

CHML (gene) has been shown to interact with RAB1A and RAB5A.

References

Further reading

External links